Pi Puppis, Latinized from π Puppis, also named Ahadi, is the second-brightest star in the southern constellation of Puppis. It has an apparent visual magnitude of 2.733, so it can be viewed with the naked eye at night. This is a double star with a magnitude 6.86 companion at an angular separation of 0.72 arcsecond and a position angle of 148° from the brighter primary.

The spectrum of Pi Puppis matches a stellar classification of K3 Ib. The Ib luminosity class indicates this a lower luminosity supergiant star that has consumed the hydrogen fuel at its core, evolved away from the main sequence, and expanded to about 235 times the Sun's radius. The effective temperature of the star's outer envelope is approximately 4,000 K, which gives it the orange hue of a K-type star. It is a semiregular variable star that varies in apparent magnitude from a high of 2.70 down to 2.85. Pi Puppis is the brightest star in the open cluster Collinder 135.

Naming
The star has the traditional name Ahadi, which is derived from Arabic for "having much promise".

References

External links
 Pi Puppis

Puppis
Puppis, Pi
K-type supergiants
Ahadi
035264
2773
056855
Durchmusterung objects
Triple star systems